The 2018 United States Senate election in Indiana took place on November 6, 2018, along with other elections to the United States Senate and House of Representatives and various state and local elections. Incumbent Democratic U.S. Senator Joe Donnelly sought reelection to a second term, facing Republican businessman and former state representative Mike Braun and Libertarian Party nominee Lucy Brenton. In 2017, Politico described the race as "possibly the GOP's best opportunity to seize a Senate seat from Democrats" in the 2018 elections. The primary election was held on May 8, 2018. In October 2018, RealClearPolitics rated the race a toss-up between the Democratic and Republican nominees, with the Libertarian receiving a poll average of 6%. Braun defeated Donnelly in the general election by a margin of 6 percent.

Background 
In 2012, Joe Donnelly was elected to the Senate with 50% of the vote to Republican nominee Richard Mourdock's 44%. In the 2016 presidential election, Republican nominee Donald Trump won Indiana with about 56.5% of the vote to Democratic nominee Hillary Clinton's 37.5%.

Democratic primary

Candidates

Nominee
Joe Donnelly, incumbent U.S. Senator

Withdrew
 Martin Del Rio, Iraq War veteran

Endorsements

Results

Republican primary

Candidates

Nominee
 Mike Braun, businessman and former state representative

Eliminated in the primary election
 Luke Messer, U.S. Representative
 Todd Rokita, U.S. Representative

Declined
 Jim Banks, U.S. Representative
 Susan Brooks, U.S. Representative (endorsed Luke Messer)
 Mike Delph, state senator (endorsed Todd Rokita)
 Jackie Walorski, U.S. Representative

Withdrawn
 Terry Henderson, businessman (endorsed Mike Braun)
 Andy Horning, Libertarian nominee for the U.S. Senate in 2012 and Libertarian nominee for IN-08 in 2014
 Mark Hurt, attorney and former congressional aide
 Andrew Takami, director of Purdue Polytechnic New Albany (endorsed Luke Messer)

Endorsements

Polling

Results

Independent

Candidates

Declared
 James Johnson, Jr.

General election

Candidates
 Mike Braun, businessman and former state representative (R)
 Lucy Brenton (L)
 Joe Donnelly, incumbent (D)
 James Johnson, Jr. (I)

Debates
Complete video of debate, October 8, 2018

Predictions

Fundraising

Endorsements

Polling
Graphical summary

with Todd Rokita

with Luke Messer

with generic Republican

Results 
On November 6, 2018, Braun won the general election. He swept southern Indiana, the exurbs of Indianapolis, and most other rural areas in the state. Donnelly ran well behind his 2012 vote totals, winning only in Indianapolis, the university centers (Bloomington, Terre Haute, West Lafayette, South Bend), and the suburbs of Chicago in Northwest Indiana.

By congressional district
Braun won 6 of 9 congressional districts.

Voter Demographics

Notes

References

External links
Candidates at Vote Smart
Candidates at Ballotpedia
Campaign finance at FEC
Campaign finance at OpenSecrets
GOP Primary Debate, February 20, 2018

Official campaign websites
Mike Braun (R) for Senate
Lucy Brenton (L) for Senate
Joe Donnelly (D) for Senate

2018
Indiana
United States Senate